is an Apollo near-Earth asteroid around  in diameter. It is the largest asteroid known to have passed closer than the Moon. On 17 September 1918 the asteroid passed  from Earth with a peak apparent magnitude of around 8.4. The 1918 close approach distance is known with an accuracy of roughly ±200 km. The asteroid had come to opposition (opposite the Sun in the sky) on 9 August 1918 at magnitude 16.

The asteroid now has a 8 year observation arc and a well determined orbit.

References

External links 
 
 
 

458732
458732
20110630